D'Ath is a surname. Notable people with this surname include:

 David D'Ath, member of The Skeptics
 Eric D'Ath (1897–1979), New Zealand pathologist
 Lawson D'Ath (born 1992), English football player
 Yvette D'Ath (born 1970), Australian politician

See also
 Dietmar Dath (born 1970), German author, journalist and translator
 Ducasse d'Ath